Dennis Frank Harris (1 January 1911 – 17 December 1959) was an English cricketer.  Harris was a right-handed batsman.  He was born at Birmingham, Warwickshire, and was educated at King Edward's School, Birmingham.

Harris made a single first-class appearance for Warwickshire against Gloucestershire at the Ashley Down Ground, Bristol, in the 1946 County Championship.  Harris batted once during the match, scoring 2 runs in Warwickshire's first-innings, before he was dismissed by Charlie Barnett.  The match ended in a draw.  This was his only major appearance for Warwickshire.

He died at the city of his birth on 17 December 1959.

References

External links
Dennis Harris at ESPNcricinfo

1911 births
1959 deaths
Cricketers from Birmingham, West Midlands
People educated at King Edward's School, Birmingham
English cricketers
Warwickshire cricketers
English cricketers of 1946 to 1968